Gwaltney Corner is an unincorporated community in Surry County, Virginia, United States. Snow Hill, a home which is listed on the National Register of Historic Places, is located near Gwaltney Corner. In 1966, a county dump site was proposed here. There are several hog farms in the area.

References

Unincorporated communities in Surry County, Virginia
Unincorporated communities in Virginia